Melissa Morrison-Howard (born July 9, 1971 in Mooresville, North Carolina) is an American hurdler best known for winning two Olympic bronze medals. She also won the bronze medal at the 2003 World Indoor Championships as well as one national indoor championships.

She is a 1993 graduate of Appalachian State University in Boone, North Carolina. During her career at Appalachian, Morrison won 12 individual Southern Conference championships and was a 1993 All-American in the 100-meter hurdles.

Personal bests

Achievements

References
 
 Melissa Morrison's U.S. Olympic Team bio

1971 births
Living people
People from Mooresville, North Carolina
Track and field athletes from North Carolina
American female hurdlers
Athletes (track and field) at the 2000 Summer Olympics
Athletes (track and field) at the 2004 Summer Olympics
Olympic bronze medalists for the United States in track and field
African-American female track and field athletes
Appalachian State University alumni
Medalists at the 2004 Summer Olympics
Medalists at the 2000 Summer Olympics
21st-century African-American sportspeople
21st-century African-American women
20th-century African-American sportspeople
20th-century African-American women
20th-century African-American people